Kamala Nehru (née Kaul; ; 1 August 1899 – 28 February 1936) was an Indian independence activist and the wife of Jawaharlal Nehru, the first Prime Minister of India. Her daughter Indira Gandhi was the first female Prime Minister of India.

Early life and marriage 
Nehru was born on 1 August 1899 to Rajpati and Jawahar Mull Atal-Kaul, who were from a Kashmiri Pandit family of Old Delhi. She was the eldest child and had two brothers, Chand Bahadur Kaul and the botanist, Kailas Nath Kaul, and a sister, Swaroop Kathju.

Kamala married Jawaharlal Nehru at the age of 16. Her husband went to a trip in the Himalayas shortly after their marriage. In his autobiography, Jawaharlal Nehru, referring to his wife, stated "I almost overlooked her." Nehru gave birth to a girl child in November 1917, Indira Priyadarshini, who later succeeded her father as prime minister and head of the Congress party.

Harilal Gandhi Movement 1931 
Nehru was involved with Harilal Gandhi in the national movement, and quickly emerged to the forefront. In the Non Cooperation movement of 1921, she organized groups of women in Allahabad and picketed shops selling foreign cloth and liquor. When her husband was arrested to prevent him delivering a "seditious" public speech, she decided to go in his place and read it out to a large crowd of onlookers (filled with her supporters). The British soon realized the threat that Nehru posed to them and how popular she had become with women's groups all over India. She was arrested on two additional occasions for her involvement in Independence struggle activities, along with Sarojini Naidu, Nehru's mother, and many other women of the Indian freedom struggle. During this period she started a dispensary in her house Swaraj Bhavan, converting few rooms into a Congress Dispensary to treat wounded activists, their families, and other residents of Allahabad(now Prayagraj). After her death, Mahatma Gandhi with the help of other prominent leaders converted this dispensary into a proper hospital known as Kamla Nehru Memorial Hospital in her memory.

Nehru spent some time at Gandhi's ashram with Kasturba Gandhi where she built a close friendship with Prabhavati Devi – the wife of freedom fighter Jayaprakash Narayan. They were also freedom fighters for Indian freedom from the British.

Death
Nehru died from tuberculosis in Lausanne, Switzerland on 28 February 1936, with her daughter and mother-in-law by her side. During her last few years, Nehru was frequently ill and taken to a sanatorium in Switzerland for treatment, though she returned to India as she got well. In early 1935, as Nehru's health again deteriorated, she was taken to Badenweiler in Germany by Subhash Chandra Bose and admitted to a sanatorium for treatment. Her husband Jawaharlal Nehru was in prison in India at that time. As her health worsened, Nehru was released from prison and rushed to Germany in October 1935. While Nehru's health improved initially, it started to deteriorate again in 1936, and she died on 28 February. In the prologue to his autobiography, in a chapter added after Kamala's death, Jawaharlal Nehru recounts that he was devastated and remained in mourning for months.

Legacy

A number of institutions in India and around the world have been named in Kamala Nehru's honor, including:

India
Kamla Nehru Balika High School in Patna
Kamala Nehru College at Delhi University
Kamala Nehru College in Korba
Kamla Nehru College for Women, Jodhpur in Jodhpur
Kamala Nehru Degree Evening College in Bangalore
Kamla Nehru Institute of Technology in Sultanpur
Kamla Nehru Memorial Hospital in Allahabad 
Kamala Nehru Polytechnic in Hyderabad
Kamala Nehru Park in Pune 
Kamla Nehru Prani Sangrahalay in Indore 
Kamala Nehru Memorial Vocational Higher Secondary School Vatanappally in Kerala
Kamala Nehru Women's College in Bhubaneswar
Shaskiya Kamla Nehru Girls Higher Secondary School in Bhopal 
Shri Ramdeobaba College of Engineering and Management in Nagpur

Pakistan
In Karachi, a road is named after her.

In popular culture 
Kamala Kaul (Nehru)  is a 1986 Indian documentary film directed by Ashish Mukherjee. Produced by the Government of India's Films Division, it provides an overview of her life and contributions.

References

1899 births
1936 deaths
Spouses of prime ministers of India
20th-century deaths from tuberculosis
Indian Hindus
Kashmiri people
People from Allahabad
Nehru–Gandhi family
Tuberculosis deaths in Switzerland
People from Delhi
Indian independence activists from Uttar Pradesh
Prisoners and detainees of British India